In mathematics, linearization is finding the linear approximation to a function at a given point. The linear approximation of a function is the first order Taylor expansion around the point of interest. In the study of dynamical systems, linearization is a method for assessing the local stability of an equilibrium point of a system of nonlinear differential equations or discrete dynamical systems.  This method is used in fields such as engineering, physics, economics, and ecology.

Linearization of a function
Linearizations of a function are lines—usually lines that can be used for purposes of calculation. In short, linearization approximates the output of a function near .

For example, . However, what would be a good approximation of ?

For any given function ,  can be approximated if it is near a known differentiable point. The point-slope form of an equation forms an equation of a line, given a point  and slope . The general form of this equation is: .

Using the point ,  becomes .

At , where  is any small positive or negative value,  is very nearly the value of the tangent line at the point .

For , .

Example
To find , we can use the fact that . The true value is close to 2.00024998, so the linearization approximation has a relative error of less than 1 millionth of a percent.

Linearization of a multivariable function

The equation for the linearization of a function  at a point  is:

The general equation for the linearization of a multivariable function  at a point  is:

.

Uses of linearization

Linearization makes it possible to use tools for studying linear systems to analyze the behavior of a nonlinear function near a given point.  The linearization of a function is the first order term of its Taylor expansion around the point of interest.  For a system defined by the equation

,

the linearized system can be written as

Stability analysis
In stability analysis of autonomous systems, one can use the eigenvalues of the Jacobian matrix evaluated at a hyperbolic equilibrium point to determine the nature of that equilibrium. This is the content of the linearization theorem. For time-varying systems, the linearization requires additional justification.

Microeconomics
In microeconomics, decision rules may be approximated under the state-space approach to linearization. Under this approach, the Euler equations of the utility maximization problem are linearized around the stationary steady state. A unique solution to the resulting system of dynamic equations then is found.

Optimization
In mathematical optimization, cost functions and non-linear components within can be linearized in order to apply a linear solving method such as the Simplex algorithm. The optimized result is reached much more efficiently and is deterministic as a global optimum.

Multiphysics
In multiphysics systems—systems involving multiple physical fields that interact with one another—linearization with respect to each of the physical fields may be performed. This linearization of the system with respect to each of the fields results in a linearized monolithic equation system that can be solved using monolithic iterative solution procedures such as the Newton–Raphson method. Examples of this include MRI scanner systems which results in a system of electromagnetic, mechanical and acoustic fields.

See also
 Linear stability
 Tangent stiffness matrix
 Stability derivatives
 Linearization theorem
 Taylor approximation
 Functional equation (L-function)

References

External links

Linearization tutorials
 Linearization for Model Analysis and Control Design

Differential calculus
Dynamical systems
Approximations